Baxter is a 1989 French horror film directed by Jérôme Boivin. The film is based on the novel Hell Hound (1977) by Ken Greenhall (under the pseudonym Jessica Hamilton). The title character is a murderous white Bull Terrier who tells the story of his search for a proper master in voice-over narration.

Plot
Baxter, a bull terrier, is taken from the pens and given to an old woman. Baxter hates the old woman's bland lifestyle and reacts to her habits with disgust. In contrast, he becomes obsessed with the young couple across the street as he observes their nightly lovemaking sessions. Baxter attempts to communicate his dominance over the old woman by causing her to stumble, but his plan backfires. The old woman's condition deteriorates, and ultimately Baxter kills her in order to be adopted by the young couple.

Baxter enjoys his life with the young couple, splitting his time between the sensual woman and the earthy man. He brings them dead animals in an attempt to show them who he is. His idyll is broken when the couple has a baby and begins to neglect him. Baxter hates the weak and helpless child. He attempts to kill it, but his plans again backfire. Ignorant of Baxter's murderous intentions, the couple gives Baxter to a neighborhood boy.

Baxter thrills under the firm hand of his new master, a budding sociopath and Hitler fanatic. The boy begins to see a girl from his school who reminds him of Eva Braun. Baxter impregnates the girl's spaniel, though his own sexuality disgusts him. Later Baxter kills a stray dog to show the boy who he is, and Baxter believes that they come to a mutual understanding. When the boy commands Baxter to kill a classmate, Baxter refuses and realizes that the boy does not understand him after all.

The girl's spaniel gives birth to puppies, and Baxter reacts to them with mixed emotions. In an attempt to emulate the final days of Hitler, the boy kills the puppies. In reaction, Baxter decides that the boy must die. The boy attacks first, but Baxter manages to gain the upper hand. When the boy commands him to heel, Baxter finds that he cannot disobey, allowing the boy to kill him. Later, the boy breaks into the old lady's abandoned house and observes the young couple across the street. In a monologue echoing Baxter's, the boy plans to kill his parents and be adopted by the couple.

Cast
 Maxime Leroux as Baxter (voiceover)
 Lise Delamare as Madame Deville 
 Bella Sana as Young Barbara
 Catherine Ferran as Florence
 Jacques Spiesser as Michel Ferrer
 Jean Mercure as Monsieur Cuzzo
 Jean-Paul Roussillon as Joseph Barsky
 Sabrina Leurquin as Noelle
 Daniel Rialet as Jean
 Evelyne Didi as Marie Cuzzo
 Rémy Carpenter as Roger Morel
 Jany Gastaldi as Anne Ferrer

Release

Home media
Baxter was released for the first time on DVD by Lionsgate on 17 July 2007.

Reception

Baxter received mostly positive reviews from critics upon its release.
Hal Hinson of The Washington Post praising the film's atmosphere, and title character, but criticized the film's uninteresting human characters. Marc Savlov from Austin Chronicle awarded the film 3.5 out of 5 stars, writing, "Baxter, like its bullet-snouted star, is a tight, wiry little film, by turns both comic and chilling." TV Guide gave the film three out of five stars, calling it "an extremely bleak, nihilistic and occasionally horrifyingly graphic depiction of all that can possibly go sour between a pet dog and his various human masters." The reviewer praised the film's direction, screenplay, performances, and title canine.

The film was not without its detractors.
Bill Gibron from DVD Talk rated the film two out of five stars, stating that he "found nothing entertaining or enlightening about this meandering mean spirited mess".

References

External links
 
 
 

1989 films
1989 horror films
1980s horror drama films
1989 independent films
French horror drama films
1980s French-language films
Films about dogs
Films based on American novels
French independent films
Films with screenplays by Jacques Audiard
1989 crime drama films
1980s French films